The 1971 2. divisjon was a Norwegian second-tier football league season.

The league was contested by 30 teams, divided into a total of four groups; A and B (non-Northern Norwegian teams) and two district groups which contained teams from Northern Norway: district IX–X and district XI. The winners of group A and B and District IX–X were promoted to the 1972 1. divisjon, and the winners of the district groups qualified for the Northern Norwegian final. The winner of district XI was not eligible for promotion. The bottom team in all groups were relegated to the 3. divisjon. The two second last teams in group A and B met in a qualification round where the losing team was relegated to the 3. divisjon.

Overview

Summary
Mjøndalen won group A with 20 points. Skeid won group B with 22 points. Both teams promoted to the 1972 1. divisjon.

Tables

Group A

Group B

District IX–X

District XI

Relegation play-offs

Results
Aurskog – Odd 0–0
Odd – Aurskog 2–0

Odd won the qualification round 2–0 on aggregate and remained in the 2. divisjon. Aurskog was relegated to the 3. divisjon.

Northern Norwegian Final
A Northern Norwegian Final was played between the winners of the two district groups, Mjølner and Kirkenes. 

Mjølner – Kirkenes 3–0

References

Norwegian First Division seasons
1971 in Norwegian football
Norway
Norway